The 2nd Joe Fry Memorial Trophy was a non-championship Formula Two motor race held at Castle Combe Circuit on 3 October 1953. The race was won by Bob Gerard in a Cooper T23-Bristol, setting fastest lap in the process. Horace Gould and Ken Wharton were second and third, also in Cooper T23s.

Results

References

Joe Fry Memorial Trophy
Joe Fry Memorial Trophy
Joe Fry Memorial Trophy